Rustam Usmanovich Khamdamov (born 24 May 1944 in Tashkent) is a Soviet and Russian film director and artist.  His film Anna Karamazoff (1991) was entered into the 1991 Cannes Film Festival.

Filmography
 1967 — In the Mountains of My Heart (short; student film, at VGIK)
 1974 — Unintentional Pleasures (unfinished)
 1991 — Anna Karamazoff
 2005 — Parallel Voices
 2010 — Diamonds (short)
 2010 — The Nutcracker in 3D, as costume designer
 2017 — The Bottomless Bag

References

External links

 Статьи о Рустаме Хамдамове на сайте журнала «Сеанс»

Soviet film directors
Russian film directors
1944 births
Living people
Soviet screenwriters
20th-century Russian screenwriters
Male screenwriters
20th-century Russian male writers
Mass media people from Tashkent
Uzbekistani painters
Soviet painters
Russian scenic designers
Honorary Members of the Russian Academy of Arts
Gerasimov Institute of Cinematography alumni